Frank Muñoz (born 14 August 1983) is a Spanish heavyweight kickboxer fighting in the SUPERKOMBAT Fighting Championship where he is the 2013 SUPERKOMBAT World Grand Prix Tournament Champion. He is also the former WAKO-Pro K-1 European champion.

Biography and career
Frank Muñoz was adopted by Menorcan family and spent his first days on the island. He started kickboxing in Barcelona in 2005 at Esportrogent gym with former fullcontact champion Xavi Moya. He had been inspired after watching Remy Bonjasky fight on television. In 2008 he moved to Amsterdam and joined Vos Gym. He was trained by Ivan Hippolyte and had famous sparring partners like Mirko Filipović, Remy Bonjasky. After that he joined Chakuriki Gym in 2010, trained by Thom Harinck alongside Le Banner, Braddock Silva, Peter Aerts and Hesdy Gerges he faced some top fighters.

He was Spanish Muay thai professional champion, in 2010 he fought Brice Guidon for his WPMF European Heavyweight Muaythai title and lost the fight by split decision. In the same year he became Amsterdam fight club heavyweight tournament champion defeating Slovenian Jasmin Bečirović and Thiago Martina in the final. Later that year he had debout for the world top promotion It's Showtime and lost to Rico Verhoeven by decision.

In 2011 he participated Enfusion: Quest for honor tournament. It was a TV Show featuring 15 fighters that live, train and fight together. During the show he defeated Sahak Parparyan and Redouan Cairo in SUPERKOMBAT, some of the best -95 kg fighters and went to the final tournament in Prague where he defeated Wendell Roche and loss to domestic Ondřej Hutník in the finals.

In 2012 he fought in a tournament for WKN kickboxing GP and lost in the finals to the one of the best French kickboxers Stéphane Susperregui after extra round. Then he fought Steve McKinnon for WBC Muaythai Super Cruiserweight World title and surprisingly lost the fight in the first round by overhand right knockout after only 16 seconds.

On October 20, 2012 he became WAKO-Pro K-1 European champion defeating Toni Čatipović from Croatia after five rounds. In the second round Čatipović caught him with few elbows but without any cut that would hinder Muñoz to take victory. Later Čatipović was few times at the edge of knockout but managed to Finnish the fight, that clearly belonged to Muñoz.

He was late replacement in a non-tournament bout at the K-1 World Grand Prix 2012 Final in Zagreb, Croatia on March 15, 2013 and he lost to Mladen Brestovac via unanimous decision .

He competed in the tournament at SUPERKOMBAT World Grand Prix 10 in Craiova, Romania on May 18, 2013. After defeating Nikolaj Falin via unanimous decision in the semi-finals, he lost a controversial unanimous decision to Sebastian Ciobanu following an extension round in the final.

As much of the kickboxing community felt that Muñoz was very solid against Ciobanu, SUPERKOMBAT officials decided to award him with a wildcard spot in the SUPERKOMBAT Grand Prix 2013.

He defeated Damien Garcia by unanimous decision in a rather lackluster fight at the K-1 World MAX 2013 World Championship Tournament Final 16 in Majorca, Spain on September 14, 2013.

He faced Muamer Tufekčić on SUPERKOMBAT World Grand Prix 2013 Final Elimination in quarter finals. In second round Muñoz sent a low blow and referee counted to Tufekčić, at the end of the round Muamer was also deducted a point for clinching. In third round Muamer scored a knockdown but could not Finnish the fight and Muñoz won by judges split decision.

He won the SUPERKOMAT World Grand Prix 2013 Final in Galați, Romania on December 21, 2013, beating D'Angelo Marshall by unanimous decision in the semi-finals before taking an extension round unanimous decision over Redouan Cairo in the final.
Graduated in International Sports Management & Business from the Hogeschool van Amsterdam class 2018.

Coached as a professional fighter by the greatest Dutch kickboxing pioneers such as Ivan Hyppolite, Mousid Akhamrane and godfather Thom Harinck, Frank absorbed the best of each coach and created a unique Kickboxing training style.

During his university internship in Chicago, he was hired as a professional sparring partner and standout strategy coach by Ultimate Fighting Championship champion Daniel Cormier. Frank helped Cormier in various fighting camps, eventually becoming the UFC light heavyweight championship in Boston. After training at the American Kickboxing Academy under head coach Javier Mendez, Frank's passion and willpower allow him to study the program in other prestigious American gyms such as Couture MMA (Las Vegas). Kings MMA (Huntington Beach) under master Rafael Cordeiro.

After the success in America, working with elite fighters and giving a Dutch kickboxing seminar tour, Frank was part of the Dutch Bellator Champion Gegard Mousasi team. (Leiden) The Netherlands.

The Swedish UFC greatest fighter of all time, Alexander Gustafsson, also hired Frank Munoz as a sparring partner and standout coach specialist at All Stars Gym Stockholm. One of the best mixed martial arts gymnastics in the UK London Shoot Fighters ask Frank Munoz training services for different fighters like the star Maikel Venom Page.

All this experience collected Frank and not only developed a training system with the best of the best gyms in the world, Frank debuted in MMA with a technical knockout victory in Austria in 2019.

Frank currently works for the sports department of the Amsterdam gementee as a Martial Artist instructor, and several spot schools in Amsterdam. Frank is an active MMA athlete.

Honours and awards
On January 24 after winning SUPERKOMAT World Grand Prix 2013 Final he was awarded with Silver Flabiol and won the "Ciutadellencs de s’Any 2013" award, becoming Sportsman of the year and the Honorary citizen of hometown Ciutadella de Menorca. On April 17, 2014 Frank Muñoz was awarded in Menorca at the I Gala de l'es port menorqui with the Gold distinction as outstanding athlete 2013.

: Honorary citizen of Ciutadella de Menorca (2013)
: Sportsman of the year Ciutadella de Menorca (2013)
: Gold distinction as outstanding athlete (2013)
: Honorary member of Penya Barcelonista Ciutadella (2014)

Titles

Professional
2013 SUPERKOMBAT World Grand Prix 2013 tournament champion
2013 SUPERKOMBAT World Grand Prix II tournament runner up
2012 WAKO-Pro K-1 European champion -94.2 kg
2012 WKN kickboxing GP runner up 
2011 Enfusion Quest for honor tournament runner up -95 kg
2010 Amsterdam fight club heavyweight tournament champion
2009 K-1 Spain Battles 2009 tournament runner up
Spanish muaythai pro champion

Amateur
2010 Spanish Olympic boxing championships 
2008 Spanish Olympic boxing championships 
2008 W.A.K.O. European Championships in Oporto, Portugal  −91 kg (K-1 rules)

Kickboxing record

See also
List of WAKO Amateur European Championships
List of K-1 champions
List of K-1 events
List of male kickboxers

References

Living people
1983 births
Spanish male kickboxers
Heavyweight kickboxers
Spanish expatriate sportspeople in the Netherlands
Sportspeople from Barcelona
Cruiserweight kickboxers
SUPERKOMBAT kickboxers